The New York Fighter Wing is an inactive United States Air Force unit.  Its last assignment was with the I Fighter Command, stationed at Mitchel Field, New York  It was inactivated on 10 April 1944.

The wing was a World War II air defense organization, reporting to First Air Force, responsible for the air defense of the New York City metropolitan area.  The wing was also a training organization for fighter groups and personnel, with assigned groups subsequently deploying to overseas theaters.

History

Lineage
 Constituted as New York Air Defense Wing on 6 August 1942
 Activated on 11 August 1942
 Redesignated New York Fighter Wing in July 1943
 Inactivated on 10 April 1944, personnel reassigned to 164th Army Air Forces Base Unit (Fighter Control).
 Disbanded on 8 October 1948.

Assignments
 I Fighter Command, 11 August 1942 – 10 April 1944

Components

 56th Fighter Group: 11 August 1942 – 12 January 1943
 58th Fighter Group: c. 3 March – 16 September 1943
 80th Fighter Group: 11 August 1942 – 10 May 1943
 348th Fighter Group: 30 September 1942 – 9 May 1943
 352d Fighter Group: 1 October 1942 – June 1943
 356th Fighter Group: 30 May – 4 July 1943

 359th Fighter Group: 11 July – 23 August 1943
 362d Fighter Group: 19 October – 12 November 1943
 368th Fighter Group: 23 August – 20 December 1943
 370th Fighter Group: 19 October 1943 – 20 January 1944
 373d Fighter Group: 23 October 1943 – 15 March 1944
 402d Fighter Group: 1–13 October 1943

Stations
 Mitchel Field, New York, 11 August 1942 – April 1946

See also
 Roslyn Air National Guard Station 164th AAFBU.

References

Notes

Bibliography

 Maurer, Maurer (1983). Air Force Combat Units Of World War II. Maxwell AFB, Alabama: Office of Air Force History. .

External links

Military units and formations established in 1942
Fighter wings of the United States Army Air Forces